Subarnarekha may refer to:
Subarnarekha (1962 film) Bengali film directed by Ritwik Ghatak
Subarnarekha River, West Bengal, India